The Portrait of Pietro Aretino is an oil on canvas portrait of the Renaissance poet Pietro Aretino by Titian, painted around 1545, possibly for Cosimo I de' Medici. It is now in the Sala di Venere of Palazzo Pitti in Florence.

References

Aretino, Pietro
Aretino, Pietro
1545 paintings
Paintings in the collection of the Galleria Palatina